is a member of the J-pop group NEWS, from Johnny's Entertainment, Inc.

Biography 
Kato was born in Hiroshima, Japan, but he grew up in Osaka and Yokohama-shi. He joined Johnny's Entertainment on April 17, 1999 when he was 11 years-old. As a junior he was a member of the organizations Best Beat Boys (B.B.B.), Boys Be Ambitious (B.B.A.), Best Beat Dancing (B.B.D.), Beautiful American Dreams (B.A.D.), J-support and K.K.Kity. He later debuted as a member of NEWS in 2003. Along with other NEWS members, he plays the guitar, composing some of NEWS' songs, including his own solo "Kakao" in 2002, which he composed the lyrics to.

On 2010, he graduated from the College of Law, Aoyama Gakuin University.

On January 28, 2012, he released his first novel, Pink to Gray and has released a novel a year since.

Works

Dramas

TV Show

Radio 
 Shiget Together (2005–2008, Sundays weekly from 11:00 pm~11:30 pm, FM-FUJI)
 SoraShige Book (2011-, Sundays weekly from 11:00 pm~11:30 pm, FM Yokohama)

Music

Stage plays

Films 
 Pink and Gray (2016) (cameo appearance)

Novels 
 Pink and Gray (Kadokawa Shoten, 2012)
 Senko Scramble (Kadokawa Shoten, 2013)
 Burn (Kadokawa Shoten, 2014)
 Kasa wo Motanai Aritachi wa (Kadokawa Shoten, 2015)
 tuberose de matteru【AGE22】(Fusou sha『shu-kan SPA!』, 2016)
 tuberose de matteru【AGE32】(Fusou sha, 2017)
Alternate (Shinchosha, 2020)

Short story 
Daiji na mono（Kadokawa Shoten,『shousetsu Yasei jidai』January 2016）
Oresama no iutoori（Kadokawa Shoten,『shousetsu Yasei jidai』August 2016）

Essay 
Cuba no reimei（Asahi shinbun sha『shousetu Tripper』spring edition 2016）

Serialization 
Wagahai wa Shige de aru（Johnny's web, 2005 – 2008）
Aoi hitorigoto（SHuei sha『Myojo』July 2006 – June 2011）
photo shigenic（wani books『Wink Up』December 2007 – March 2016）
Girl Friends（Shuei sha『Myojo』May 2012 – ）
Shigeaki no cloud（Johnny's web, November 2015 – ）
dekiru koto nara steed de（Asahi shinbun sha『shousetu TRIPPER』Winter edition 2016 – ）

Productions 
 Kasa wo Motanai Aritachi wa (2016) as Original work
 Pink and Gray (2016) as Original work

References

External links 
 Johnny & Associates site

Japanese male idols
Japanese baritones
News (band) members
Living people
1987 births
Aoyama Gakuin University alumni
Musicians from Hiroshima
Musicians from Osaka Prefecture
Musicians from Kanagawa Prefecture
People from Yokohama
Japanese male short story writers
Japanese essayists
21st-century Japanese novelists
20th-century Japanese male singers
20th-century Japanese singers
21st-century Japanese male singers
21st-century Japanese singers